Dhanusri Muhunan (born 29 September 2003) is a Malaysian cricketer. She made her Women's Twenty20 International (WT20I) debut for Malaysia on 9 June 2018, in the 2018 Women's Twenty20 Asia Cup, t the age of 14 years. In November 2021, she was named in Malaysia's side for the 2021 ICC Women's T20 World Cup Asia Qualifier tournament in the United Arab Emirates.
In September 2022, she was selected in Malaysia's squad for Women's Twenty20 Asia Cup.

References

External links
 

2003 births
Living people
Malaysian women cricketers
Malaysia women Twenty20 International cricketers
Malaysian people of Tamil descent
Malaysian sportspeople of Indian descent
20th-century Malaysian women